Millicent or Milicent is a female given name that has been in use since the Middle Ages. The English form Millicent derives from the Old French Melisende, from the Germanic amal "work" and swinth "strength".

People
 Millicent Armstrong (1888–1973), Australian playwright
 Millicent Aroi, Nauruan diplomat
 Milicent Bagot (1907–2006), British intelligence officer
 Millicent Bandmann-Palmer (1845–1926), English actress
 Millicent Baxter (1888–1984), New Zealand pacifist
 Millicent Borges Accardi, Portuguese-American poet and writer
 Millicent Browne (1881-1975), British suffragate
 Millicent Dillon (born 1925), American writer
 Millicent Fawcett (1847–1929), English suffragist, feminist, intellectual, political and union leader and writer
 Millicent Fenwick (1910–1992), American fashion editor and politician
 Millicent S. Ficken (1933–2020), American ornithologist
 Millicent Hearst (1882–1974), American socialite and philanthropist, wife of media tycoon William Randolph Hearst
Millicent Leveson-Gower, Duchess of Sutherland (1867–1955), British society hostess, social reformer, author, editor, journalist and playwright
 Millicent Mackenzie (1863–1942), British professor of education, first female professor in Wales and the first appointed to a fully chartered university in the United Kingdom
 Millicent Martin (born 1934), British actress, singer and comedian
 Millicent Preston-Stanley (1883–1955), Australian feminist and politician, first female member of the New South Wales Legislative Assembly
 Millicent Selsam (1912–1996), American children's author
 Milicent Shinn (1858–1940), American child psychologist, first woman to receive a doctorate from the University of California, Berkeley
 Millicent Silver (1905–1986), British harpsichordist, pianist and violinist
 Millicent Simmonds (born 2003), a deaf actor
 Millie Small (born 1946), Jamaican singer-songwriter
 Millicent Sowerby (1878–1967), English painter and illustrator,
 See also Amalasuintha, queen of the Ostrogoths

Fictional characters
Millicent, character in the action role-playing game Elden Ring
Millicent Carew, fiancée to Dr. Jekyll in the 1920 film adaptation of Dr. Jekyll and Mr. Hyde 
Millicent, in the 1957 Bugs Bunny cartoon Rabbit Romeo
Millicent, fictional term for police officers in the nadsat slang of the 1962 novel A Clockwork Orange by Anthony Burgess
Millicent Bagnold, in the Harry Potter series
Millicent Collins, comic book heroine best known as Millie the Model
Millicent Bulstrode, in the Harry Potter series
Millicent Bystander, the mistaken alias of Roddy St. James in the 2006 film Flushed Away
Millicent Min, heroine of Millicent Min, Girl Genius, 2003 novel by Lisa Yee
Millicent Huxtable, in the television series One Tree Hill
Millicent Mudd, in the webcomic Ozy and Millie
Millicent Weems, in the 2008 film Synecdoche, New York
Millicent Carter, recurring character in ER.
Millicent Arnold, in the short story "Initiation" by Sylvia Plath
Millicent "Penny" Woods, a character on the television series Good Times
Millicent "Millie" Princey, a character on the episode "Wet Saturday" of the series Alfred Hitchcock Presents
Millicent Barnes, main character in the 1960 Twilight Zone episode "Mirror Image"
Millicent Gergich, recurring character in the television series Parks and Recreation
Millicent Collins, a Collins family ancestor in the 1960s soap opera Dark Shadows
Milicent Darnham, in the 1831 novel Mothers and Daughters (vol. 3) by Catherine Gore
Millicent Crosswire, mother of Muffy Crosswire in the 1996 cartoon adaption Arthur (TV series)
Millicent "Minx" Lawrence, a young girl who becomes a friend of Drill and player of his game in the television series The Whispers
Aunt Millicent, an original character created for the 2003 film adaptation of Peter Pan, portrayed by Lynn Redgrave
Millicent Margaret Amanda, full name of the title character in the Milly-Molly-Mandy series

Places
 Millicent, Alberta, an unincorporated community

See also
Melisende (disambiguation)
Melisande (disambiguation)
Millie (disambiguation)
Amalasuntha

References

English feminine given names
English given names